Dercetis is the name of a nymph in Greek mythology.

Mythology 
In Statius' Thebaid, she is portrayed as a sexually aggressive figure who ravishes a youth named Lapithaon despite his being too young and not mature enough for a sexual relationship. From their union is born Alatreus, said to have later become a rival of his own father in terms of youthful good looks: the two could be easily mistaken for brothers thanks to the small age difference. The story of Dercetis, Lapithaon and Alatreus is told to Antigone by her old tutor as she is asking him questions about participants of the war of the Seven against Thebes, Lapithaon and Alatreus being two of those. Further in the poem, it is noted of Alatreus that he was still a boy at the time, but already valiant enough for his father to be proud of him.

Notes

References 

 Publius Papinius Statius, The Thebaid translated by John Henry Mozley. Loeb Classical Library Volumes. Cambridge, MA, Harvard University Press; London, William Heinemann Ltd. 1928. Online version at the Topos Text Project.
 Publius Papinius Statius, The Thebaid. Vol I-II. John Henry Mozley. London: William Heinemann; New York: G.P. Putnam's Sons. 1928. Latin text available at the Perseus Digital Library.

External links
Statius, Thebaid at Classical E-Text - Book 7

Nymphs
Boeotian characters in Greek mythology